Tom B. W. Berendsen is a Dutch politician who has served as a Member of the European Parliament (MEP) since 2019. He is a member of the Christian Democratic Appeal (CDA).

Education and early career
Berendsen studied public administration at Tilburg University, as well as at the Catholic University of Leuven as part of an Erasmus exchange.

Following his studies, Berendsen moved to Brussels where he became a lobbyist for North Brabant. From 2009 until 2015, he worked for the CDA delegation at the European Parliament. He later worked as a sustainability consultant for PricewaterhouseCoopers in the Netherlands.

Political career
Berendsen has been a Member of the European Parliament since the 2019 European elections. In the European Parliament, he has since served on the Committee on Industry, Research and Energy and the Committee on Regional Development. In addition to his committee assignments, he is part of the Parliament's delegation for relations to the Pan-African Parliament. He is also a member of the URBAN Intergroup.

References

Living people
People from Breda
MEPs for the Netherlands 2019–2024
Christian Democratic Appeal MEPs
1983 births